Cortinarius indolicus is a basidiomycete fungus of the genus Cortinarius native to New Zealand.

See also

List of Cortinarius species

References

External links

indolicus
Fungi of New Zealand
Fungi described in 1990
Taxa named by Egon Horak